
Lac de Géronde (German: Gerundensee) is a lake at Sierre, Valais, Switzerland. At an elevation of 523 metres (1,716 ft), it has a surface area of 0.055 square kilometres.

A trail, made out of woodchips, leads around the lake. A public bathing beach, the „Bains de Géronde“, is located at the northwest border of the lake. Besides the main lake, there are two "petit lacs" (small lakes) close by.

From Sierre train station, the Lac de Géronde can be reached by foot in 10 minutes.

External links
 Internet page of the lac de Géronde
 Lac de Géronde on schweizersee.ch

Geronde
Sierre